The 2019 AFF U-18 Youth Championship or AFF U18 Next Media Cup 2019 was the 17th edition of the AFF U-19 Youth Championship, organised by ASEAN Football Federation. It was hosted by Vietnam during August 2019. Twelve member associations of the ASEAN Football Federation took part in the tournament featuring two groups of six teams.

Australia beat Malaysia 1–0 in the final for their fifth title in the championship.

Participant teams 
All of 12 teams from member associations of the ASEAN Football Federation are eligible for the tournament.

A total of 12 teams from 12 member associations entered the tournament, listed below:

Squads

Officials 

Referees
  Lim Bunthoeun (Cambodia)
  Dwi Purba Adi Wicaksana (Indonesia)
  Thoriq Munir Alkatiri (Indonesia)
  Souei Vongkham (Laos)
  Xaypaseuth Phongsanit (Laos)
  Razlan Joffri Ali (Malaysia)
  Myat Thu (Myanmar)
  Clifford Daypuyat (Philippines)
  Ahmad A'qashah Ahmad Al'Badowe (Singapore)
  Mongkolchai Pechsri (Thailand)
  Wiwat Jumpaoon (Thailand)
  Ngô Duy Lân (Vietnam)

Assistant referees
  Owen Goldrick (Australia)
  Son Chanphearith (Cambodia)
  Bambang Syamsudar (Indonesia)
  Nurhadi (Indonesia)
  Kilar Ladsavong (Laos)
  Mohd Arif Shamil Abd Rasid (Malaysia)
  Mohd Shahreen Che Omar (Malaysia)
  Aye Chit Moe (Myanmar)
  Francis Engalgado (Philippines)
  Rachain Srichai (Thailand)
  Rawut Nakarit (Thailand)
  Phan Huy Hoàng (Vietnam)

Group stage 
 All times listed are ICT (UTC+7).

Group A

Group B

Knockout stage 
In the knockout stage, the penalty shoot-out is used to decide the winner if necessary.

Bracket

Semi-finals

Third place match

Final

Winner

Awards

Goalscorers

Final ranking

References

External links 
 

2019
2019 in AFF football
2019 in youth association football
International association football competitions hosted by Vietnam